Fatmir Agalliu was a writer from Albania.

Life and career
Prof. Fatmir Agalliu was born in the village of Fier, on June 19, 1933, and died in Tirana on June 5, 1998. His grandfather took an active part as a leader in the fight of Vlora in 1920. His mother was mentioned for her patriotism. Agalliu was self-taught in 7 languages, including Russian, Italian, Spanish, Romanian, French, and English.

In 1988, Agaulliu received a Master of Science and received the title of Docent in 1992. In 1995, he became a Doctor of Sciences and in 1999 his PhD from  University of Cambridge.

He is the first Albanian who deserves this title. Published in 2007 posthumously honor Cultural Patriotic Association, Cakran But in 2007, the association announced Mbarkombetare honor Ismail Kamal, motivation and outstanding scientist Professor of Linguistics Albanian. In 2009, proclaimed honorary citizen of Fier. Dekorohet in 2009 by the President of the Republic with the Order of the Great Master, the motivation for outstanding contribution to the development of national education for special merit. In the field of Linguistics and journalism. As well as in the preparation of generations of teachers and young researchers. This order has received only Fatmir Agalliu. Ne Fier Municipal Council in 2009. Take the decision that a road in Fier bear the name Fatmir Agalliu In 2010 Tirana Municipal Council decided that a street in Tirana called Fatmir Agalliu.

In 1974 has lectured in Pristina and Skopje. In 1992, he published an article in the German press. Fatmir have written to Geneva in Switzerland, Kaplan Resuli. By Professor Isuf Luzaj America, wrote the epitaph for 1 Light Newspaper Fatmir Agalliu with 105 verses. As compared with Skender Bey, Budi, the biggest of the Colossus Bogdani our nation. and the universe of the book for Fatmir monograph on language and style of Noli in his original works has made a sensational review. We grammar published by two German albanolog. Oda Buchholz and W. Fiedel Fatmir perfshien 10 works. Worked 30 years as a teacher in Shkodra and Tirane. Ku and early retirement, giving doreqehje irrevocably.

References

External links
 Info Arkiva 

1933 births
1998 deaths
People from Fier
Albanian academics
Alumni of the University of Cambridge
Linguists from Albania
20th-century linguists